Le Mesnil-Rainfray is a former commune in the Manche department in Normandy in north-western France. On 1 January 2017, it was merged into the new commune Juvigny les Vallées. This is an agricultural community, mainly dairy cattle, forage maze and cider apple production.

See also
Communes of the Manche department

References

Mesnilrainfray